Quaianlage, Quai-Anlage, or Quai Anlage (plural: Quaianlagen) is a German term for a quay, or quayside. As a place name, it may refer to:

Germany:
Quai Anlage Spree, in Berlin

Switzerland:
Quaianlagen in Zurich
Quai Anlage in Arbon (TG)
Quaianlagen in Gersau (SZ)
Quaianlagen in Lucerne
Quaianlage (am See) in Sisikon (UR)